Muddy Creek is a tributary of Slippery Rock Creek in Butler and Lawrence Counties in Pennsylvania in the United States. Muddy Creek is the main water source for Lake Arthur in Moraine State Park.

See also
List of rivers of Pennsylvania

References

Rivers of Pennsylvania
Tributaries of the Beaver River
Rivers of Butler County, Pennsylvania
Rivers of Lawrence County, Pennsylvania